Henri-Joseph Rigel (9 February 1741 – 2 May 1799) was a German-born composer of the Classical era who spent most of his working life in France. He was born in Wertheim am Main where his father was musical intendant to the local prince. After an education in Germany, where his teachers included Niccolò Jommelli, Rigel moved to Paris in 1767. He quickly acquired a reputation in musical circles and published harpsichord pieces, string quartets, symphonies and concertos. He began composing for the Concert Spirituel, most notably four hiérodrames (oratorios on sacred themes): La sortie d'Egypte (1774), La destruction de Jericho (1778), Jephté (1783) and Les Macchabées (score lost). These show the influence of Christoph Willibald Gluck, and Gluck himself praised La sortie d'Égypte. Between 1778 and 1799 Rigel also wrote 14 operas, including the opéra comique Le savetier et le financier (1778).

Recordings
Six quatuors dialogués, Opus 10: Quatuor Franz Joseph (Atma Records, 2005)
La sortie d'Égypte, La destruction de Jéricho, Jephté, three oratorios: Les Chantres du Centre de Musique Baroque de Versailles, Orchestre des Folies Françoises, conducted by Olivier Schneebeli (K617 Records, 2007)
Symphonies: Concerto Köln (Berlin Classics, 2009)

External links

1741 births
1799 deaths
People from Wertheim am Main
18th-century classical composers
German Classical-period composers
German male classical composers
German opera composers
Male opera composers
Academic staff of the Conservatoire de Paris
Pupils of Niccolò Jommelli
18th-century German composers
18th-century German male musicians